Deri Antony Corfe (born 3 March 1998) is an English  footballer who most recently played for Scottish Championship club Arbroath.

Early life and career
Born in Chester, England, Corfe spent his childhood with the Manchester City youth academy, before moving to the United States to play football at University of Rio Grande. After two seasons, he transferred to Wright State University.

During his junior and senior years, Corfe played for the Ocean City Nor'easters, where he would later be named as the USL League Two MVP for the 2019 season after recording 14 goals and three assists in 12 matches.

Professional career

New York Red Bulls
Corfe was select 41st overall in the 2020 MLS SuperDraft by the New York Red Bulls. He signed with the club's USL Championship side New York Red Bulls II on 6 March 2020. Corfe was released by Red Bulls II on 30 November 2020.

FC Tucson
On 13 April 2021, Corfe joined USL League One side FC Tucson ahead of the 2021 season. Corfe and Tucson mutually agreed to end his contract with the club on July 22, 2022.

Arbroath
Corfe signed a one-year contract with Scottish Championship club Arbroath in August 2022. He left the club in January 2023 at the end of his short-term deal.

Career statistics

Honours

Individual
USL League Two MVP (1): 2019

References

External links 
 

1998 births
Living people
English footballers
Association football midfielders
Rio Grande RedStorm men's soccer players
Sportspeople from Chester
Wright State Raiders men's soccer players
Manchester City F.C. players
Ocean City Nor'easters players
New York Red Bulls II players
New York Red Bulls draft picks
USL League Two players
USL Championship players
English expatriate footballers
FC Tucson players
Arbroath F.C. players